Lisa Christiansen is a Canadian radio personality. She has hosted the programs Appetite for Distraction on CBC Radio 3 and Between the Covers on CBC Radio One. She left CBC Radio 3 on May 11, 2012, to pursue other roles with the CBC. She is currently the reporter/editor for The Early Edition.

With CBC Radio 3, she also hosted a number of podcasts in addition to her primary on-air shift, including Extended Play, in which she interviewed Canadian musicians about broader cultural topics related to music, and Full Metal Podcast, devoted to Canadian heavy metal music. She has also served on the nominating jury of the Polaris Music Prize.

References

Living people
Year of birth missing (living people)
CBC Radio hosts
Canadian women radio hosts